The Santiago South Super Cup (Portuguese: Super Taça de Santiago Sul) is a regional super cup competition played during the season in the south of Santiago, Cape Verde consisting the municipalities of Praia, Ribeira Grande de Santiago and São Domingos. The competition is organized by the Santiago South Regional Football Association (Associação Regional de Futebol de Santiago Sul de Futebol, ARFSS). Its current champions is Sporting Praia who won their third and recent title. The regional champion competes with the cup champion. If a champion also has a cup title, a cup club who is runner-up qualifies. The upcoming edition will feature the champion Académica da Praia and the cup winner Sporting Praia.

Several cancellations occurred including in 2011, 2014, the time when Pico do Fogo on the nearby island to the west was erupting and the 2016 edition, as the cup competition took place on April 15, 2017, the super cup competition which was slanted for May or June 2017 may have been canceled.

Winners

1Runner up in the cup final as the regional cup winner was also the regional champion that season

Performance By Club

See also
Sports in Santiago, Cape Verde
Santiago South Cup
Santiago South Premier Division
Santiago South Association Cup

Notes

References

Sport in Santiago, Cape Verde
Football cup competitions in Cape Verde
2007 establishments in Cape Verde